John Barth (April 4, 1927 – October 16, 2004) was an American football and basketball player and coach.  He served as the head football coach at University of Wisconsin–Platteville from 1964 to 1965, and coached the school's men's basketball team from 1946 to 1963.

Head coaching record

College football

References

1927 births
2004 deaths
Ripon Red Hawks football players
Wisconsin–Platteville Pioneers athletic directors
Wisconsin–Platteville Pioneers football coaches
Wisconsin–Platteville Pioneers men's basketball coaches
High school football coaches in Wisconsin
People from Rockford, Illinois
Players of American football from Illinois